The Bergenfield Public School District is a comprehensive community public school district that serves students in pre-kindergarten through twelfth grade from Bergenfield in Bergen County, New Jersey, United States.

As of the 2020–21 school year, the district, comprised of seven schools, had an enrollment of 3,666 students and 283.0 classroom teachers (on an FTE basis), for a student–teacher ratio of 13.0:1.

The district is classified by the New Jersey Department of Education as being in District Factor Group "FG", the fourth-highest of eight groupings. District Factor Groups organize districts statewide to allow comparison by common socioeconomic characteristics of the local districts. From lowest socioeconomic status to highest, the categories are A, B, CD, DE, FG, GH, I and J.

Schools 
Schools in the district (with 2020–21 enrollment data from the National Center for Education Statistics) are:
Elementary schools
Franklin Elementary School with 345 students in grades K-5
Everett B. Thompson, Principal
Hoover Elementary School with 261 students in grades K-5
William Fleming, Principal
Jefferson Elementary School with 278 students in grades K-5
Craig Vogt, Principal
Lincoln Elementary School with 410 students in grades PreK-5
James Mitchel, Principal
Washington Elementary School with 300 students in grades K-5
Thomas Lawrence, Principal
Middle school
Roy W. Brown Middle School with 855 students in grades 6-8
Shane Biggins, Principal

High school
Bergenfield High School with 1,203 students in grades 9-12
James Fasano, Principal

Administration 
Core members of the district's administration are:
Dr. Christopher Tully, Superintendent of Schools
JoAnn Khoury-Frias, Business Administrator / Board Secretary

Board of education
The district's board of education is comprised of five members who set policy and oversee the fiscal and educational operation of the district through its administration. As a Type II school district, the board's trustees are elected directly by voters to serve three-year terms of office on a staggered basis, with either one or two seats up for election each year held (since 2012) as part of the November general election. The board appoints a superintendent to oversee the district's day-to-day operations and a business administrator to supervise the business functions of the district.

References

External links 
Bergenfield Public Schools website

School Data for the Bergenfield Public Schools, National Center for Education Statistics

Bergenfield, New Jersey
New Jersey District Factor Group FG
School districts in Bergen County, New Jersey